Víctor Liz - (born May 12, 1986) is a Dominican basketball player for Libertadores de Querétaro of the Liga Nacional de Baloncesto Profesional (LNBP). Internationally, Liz represents and plays for the Dominican national team, where he participated at the 2014 FIBA Basketball World Cup.

References

1986 births
Living people
Dominican Republic men's basketball players
Leones de Ponce basketball players
Point guards
Shooting guards
Basketball players at the 2011 Pan American Games
Pan American Games competitors for the Dominican Republic
People from Santiago de los Caballeros
2014 FIBA Basketball World Cup players
2019 FIBA Basketball World Cup players